The 1971 Cal State Fullerton Titans football team represented California State College at Fullerton—now known as California State University, Fullerton—as a member of the California Collegiate Athletic Association (CCAA) during the 1971 NCAA College Division football season. Led by Dick Coury in his second and final season as head coach, Cal State Fullerton compiled an overall record of 7–4 with a mark of 3–1 in conference play, placing second in the CCAA. At the end of the season, the Titans took part in the second Mercy Bowl, a benefit for the families of three Cal State Fullerton assistant coaches who had perished in a plane crash a month earlier. Cal State Fullerton played home games at three different sites: four games Anaheim Stadium in Anaheim, California, one at Santa Ana Stadium in Santa Ana, California, and one at the Los Angeles Memorial Coliseum in Los Angeles.

Schedule

Team players in the NFL
No Cal State Fullerton Titans were selected in the 1972 NFL Draft.

The following finished their college career in 1971, were not drafted, but played in the NFL.

References

Cal State Fullerton
Cal State Fullerton Titans football seasons
Cal State Fullerton Titans football